Jack Law is the owner of Hula's Bar & Lei Stand in Waikiki and has a long-standing business history in Hawaii. He is also recognized as one of the most influential advocates for gay culture in Honolulu. As a business man he helped create and operate two of Waikiki's known nightclubs and bars: The Wave Waikiki and Hula's Bar & Lei Stand, as an advocate for gay rights and culture he founded the Life Foundation and the Rainbow Film Festival which publicized gay and lesbian culture in Hawaii. He was appointed by Governors John Waihee and Ben Cayetano to the State of Hawaii Civil Rights Commission where he served for eight years.

Early years
Born in Philadelphia, Pennsylvania Law spent his early years in Detroit, Michigan. He got his first taste of the tropical weather at the age of seven when his family moved to Florida. Unfortunately, the military life style of his parents sent the family back to the harsh winters of Detroit where he yearned for warmer weather. Law found himself working at a record company in downtown Detroit as a young man, at the time when Motown Records was in its heyday. Seeking refuge from the depressing Michigan winters, Law and two of his buddies packed their bags and moved to Honolulu, Hawaii. Although the third member of their trio lasted only a year before returning to Michigan, to Law and his buddy, John Dobovan, Hawaii became home. "I can't imagine what my life would have been like if I hadn't come to Hawaii. I strongly feel that we have a choice and there's a dichotomy of being predestined for certain things. I really feel like I was predestined to come to Hawaii.

East West Productions- entry into the music business
While assisting Bob Magoon with his musical production, Law also started a record company called East West Productions. He and Magoon put together a band, The Potted Palm led by Tina Santiago. Jack produced their record written by Magoon, titled House of Grass. Eventually he began managing the group. During a time when the liquor laws required a live band to serve liquor and allow dancing in an establishment, live bands were playing on every block down Kalakaua and Kuhio Avenues. The Potted Palm was a regular act at the Diamond Head Restaurant which was located in the Colony Surf West (now the Lotus Hotel). Later the owner of the Colony Surf Hotel and Michel's Restaurant, Rainee Barkhorn wanted to start the first real discotheque in Hawaii called "Pavillon de Michel." The Potted Palm auditioned and found a home for the next three years.

During this time Law found himself managing other artists and bands, among them were Lopaka, Ed Kenny (who was performing at the Monarch Room at the Royal Hawaiian), and the Sunday Manoa Trio. It was while watching the Sunday Manoa Trio perform at the Outrigger Canoe Club that he was asked to leave because his shoulder length hair was in violation of the club's hair policy. "This was a time when the country was split and one of the things that was important at the time was hair", Law recounts. "The Vietnam war was going on and Hawaii found itself split between the Doves and the Hawks".

Eventually time went on. The war ended and the liquor laws evolved. Bands were no longer needed and Law began looking for other opportunities. He once again found himself in new territory thrown into the real estate business through  Bob Magoon. Magoon's real estate business was just about to start on a building called 1717 Ala Wai – a little shopping center at a space called Eaton Square. Being in the middle of a major real estate development in Honolulu, meeting with real estate lawyers, accountants and developers, Law quickly learned the real estate business inside and out. He obtained his real estate salesman's license then soon after, his real estate broker's license.

The start of Hulas Bar and Lei Stand
Law continued to work in real estate when a piece of property belonging to the Magoon Estate became available. Sitting across from the Kuhio movie theater on the corner of Kuhio Avenue and Kalaimoku Street sat what used to be a house and more recently a laundromat and small restaurant. The ever confident Bob Magoon brought up the idea of opening up a bar. And although Jack tried to reason that they knew nothing about running a bar, Bob's "anything is possible" attitude eventually won out. With no more than $10,000 they put up a lattice fence and turned the broken-down house/restaurant/laundromat/parking lot into Hula's Bar and Lei Stand. There, under the iconic big banyan tree began what would become a legendary establishment. Being 1974, it was a time of liberation and freedom but gay bars were typically delegated to the side streets. Hula's Bar and Lei Stand sat on a prominent corner and after a few years of struggle it became a landmark. Halloween parties evolved into Hula-ween and New Year's Eve parties became the go to spot for New Year's Eve in Waikiki. "Hula's became a place where it didn't matter if you were gay or straight. If you were a celebrity and happened to be in Waikiki you were in Hula's during your stay sometime," says Law. Elton John, Dolly Parton, Barry Manilow, all at one point passed through the lattice fence. Hula's soon found itself as somewhat of an anchor tenant in what would be known as the "Kuhio District" named after the Castro District in San Francisco. Eventually, the area surrounding Hula's became the gay mecca in Waikiki.

The Wave
In 1979 Law set his eyes on a vacant building which would soon become The Wave Waikiki. It opened its doors in November 1980 and Law eventually found himself in a dilemma with two competing businesses. The solution was to create an identity for The Wave that would allow it to stand on its own. Soon The Wave became an entity in itself and eventually became the go-to venue for live rock and roll entertainment in Waikiki until its close in 2006.

The end of Hulas and the start of View Hulas
Meanwhile in 1996 the Magoon Estate sold their development rights to the property where Hula's Bar and Lei Stand was located. Law was forced to find a new location. After two years of looking, he finally found an abandoned restaurant with an unparalleled view on the second floor of the Waikiki Grand Hotel which he would later dub "View Hula's." Despite some animosity from the old customers, View Hula's has been successfully operating since its doors opened in 1998.

Civil Rights Commission/Life Foundation
He was also appointed by Governors Waihee and Cayetano to the State of Hawaii Civil Rights Commission where he served for 8 years. At a time when AIDS was still a "mainland problem" he was asked by Dr. David McEwen to become a founding board member of the Life Foundation, and held the first board meeting at Law's dining room table.

Honolulu Rainbow Film Festival
Law founded the Honolulu Adam Baran Gay Film Festival in honor of his close friend who was one of the first people he knew to fall victim to the AIDS epidemic. Inspired by Adam Baran's video editing talents, what started as a few video tapes shown at Hula's has grown to become the Honolulu Rainbow Film Festival in Honor of Adam Baran and the Gay and Lesbian Cultural Foundation. In 2009, Law stepped down from serving as president.

References

Drinking establishment owners
Year of birth missing (living people)
Living people
American LGBT rights activists
Businesspeople from Detroit
LGBT people from Michigan
LGBT people from Hawaii